Claude Godard d'Aucourt (1716–1795) was an 18th-century French writer, marquis of .

He did not migrate during the French Revolution and managed to retain a portion of his non manorial estate. The librettist Claude Godard d'Aucourt de Saint-Just was his son.

Works 
1745: Les Mémoires turcs, avec l'Histoire galante de deux jeunes Turcs durant leur séjour en France
1745: Thémidore ou Mon Histoire et celle de ma maîtresse

Librettos 
1798: Zoraïme et Zulnar

External links 
 Claude Godard d'Aucour on The Online Books Page

1716 births
1795 deaths
People from Langres
18th-century French writers
18th-century French male writers
18th-century French dramatists and playwrights
French opera librettists